Gabino Apolonio (born August 29, 1971) is a retired male long-distance runner from Mexico. He set his personal best (2:13:25) in the men's marathon on March 3, 2002 in Torreón.

A distance specialist, he enjoyed success at regional level in the mid-1990s, taking the silver medal over 5000 metres at the 1993 CAC Games and the 10,000 metres bronze medal at 1993 CAC Championships. He won another CAC Games medal in 1998, taking home the bronze in the men's 10,000. Today he is an assistant manager and teacher in a high school in Toluca, Mexico.

Achievements

References

1971 births
Living people
Mexican male long-distance runners
Universiade medalists in athletics (track and field)
Central American and Caribbean Games silver medalists for Mexico
Central American and Caribbean Games bronze medalists for Mexico
Competitors at the 1993 Central American and Caribbean Games
Competitors at the 1998 Central American and Caribbean Games
Universiade bronze medalists for Mexico
Central American and Caribbean Games medalists in athletics
Medalists at the 1995 Summer Universiade
20th-century Mexican people
21st-century Mexican people